Moriz Freiherr von Lyncker (30 January 1853 – 20 January 1932) was a Prussian officer of the German Empire and Chief of the Military Cabinet of Emperor Wilhelm II.

He was one of the general adjutants of the Kaiser during World War I with Oskar von Chelius, Hans von Plessen, and Hans von Gontard.

Life 
Lyncker was born in Spandau, Prussia, into a military family, with his father, his father-in-law and two brothers being officers. He took part in the Franco-Prussian War of 1870-71, and two of his sons died in the First World War.

His association with the Prussian royal family began when he served as aide-de-camp to Crown Prince Frederick William as a captain. Subsequently Lyncker was appointed military mentor to the adolescent Crown Prince Wilhelm and Prince Eitel Friedrich for three years, until 1898. After resuming his regular career, he successively commanded a Guards regiment and brigade, before taking up leadership of the 19th Division at Hannover in 1905.

After the sudden death of the Chief of the Military Cabinet, General Dietrich von Hülsen-Haeseler, von Lyncker was on 17 November 1908 appointed to the post. He was responsible for personnel matters of the Prussian army and during First World War he was one of the closest aides to Kaiser Wilhelm II. He was present at the famous Imperial War Council of 8 December 1912.

He has been evaluated as "politically innocent, intellectually mediocre, with subservient devotion to Wilhelm II."

On the other hand, as the First World War progressed and the Kaiser withdrew into an atmosphere of "fear of the world and flight from reality", he worked with Georg Alexander von Müller, Chief of the Imperial Naval Cabinet, at great lengths to persuade  him to spend more time on the business of the government in Berlin.

By 10 August 1914 he was considering replacing Helmuth von Moltke with Erich von Falkenhayn as Chief of the German General Staff. After the failure of the Battle of the Marne it was his duty to convince von Moltke to leave.

After 1915 he was ready to moderate Germany's aims to achieve peace, but still demanded that the Reich should retain Belgium or at least the Belgian ports for future use against Britain. Like Falkenhayn, he wanted a compromise peace with the Russian Empire and a substantial victory over Britain and France.

He died  in Demnitz, Germany.

Ranks 
 1870: Fahnenjunker
 1895-1898: Leutnant ... Oberst
 1901: Generalmajor
 1905: Generalleutnant
 1909: General der Infanterie
 1918: Generaloberst

Honours
German orders and decorations
 Grand Cross of the Order of the Red Eagle, with Crown (Prussia)
 Knight of the Royal Order of the Crown, 1st Class (Prussia)
 Iron Cross (1870), 2nd Class (Prussia)
 Commander's Cross of the Royal House Order of Hohenzollern (Prussia)
 Knight of Justice of the Johanniter Order (Prussia)
 Service Award Cross (Prussia)
 Pour le Mérite (military), 2 November 1917 (Prussia)
 Grand Cross of the Order of the Zähringer Lion, 1909 (Baden)
 Grand Cross of the Merit Order of Philip the Magnanimous, 19 August 1909 (Hesse and by Rhine)
 Grand Cross of the Order of the Württemberg Crown (Württemberg)
 Grand Cross of the Friedrich Order, with Crown (Württemberg)

Foreign orders and decorations
 Grand Cross of the Austrian Imperial Order of Leopold, 1910 (Austria-Hungary)
 Knight of the Imperial Order of the Iron Crown, 1st Class, 1909 (Austria-Hungary)
 Knight of the Imperial Austrian Order of Franz Joseph, 1877 (Austria-Hungary)
 Grand Cross of the Order of the Dannebrog (Denmark)
 Commander Grand Cross of the Royal Order of the Sword (Sweden)

Notes

References

Sources
 Holger Afflerbach (Hrsg.): Kaiser Wilhelm II. als Oberster Kriegsherr im Ersten Weltkrieg. Quellen aus der militärischen Umgebung des Kaisers 1914 - 1918, Munich: Oldenbourg 2005,  (Umfangreiche Sammlung von Briefen Lynckers an seine Frau über den Kaiser in der Kriegszeit)
 
 Biographische Skizze in: Kaiser Wilhelm II als Oberster Kriegsherr im Ersten Weltkrieg'', hrsg. von Holger Afflerbach, München 2005 (Inhaltsverzeichnis, Akademie Aktuell:  Rezension), Heft 1/2007, S.37f.

External links 

1853 births
1932 deaths
Barons of Germany
People from Spandau
Colonel generals of Prussia
German military personnel of the Franco-Prussian War
German Army generals of World War I
19th-century Prussian military personnel
Recipients of the Pour le Mérite (military class)
Recipients of the Iron Cross (1870), 2nd class
Knights of the Order of Franz Joseph
Grand Crosses of the Order of the Dannebrog
Commanders Grand Cross of the Order of the Sword
Military personnel from Berlin